Fernand Bonnier de La Chapelle (4 November 1922 – 26 December 1942) was a royalist member of the French Resistance during World War II. He assassinated Admiral of the Fleet François Darlan, the former chief of government of Vichy France and the high commissioner of French North Africa and West Africa, on 24 December 1942.

Background

Bonnier de La Chapelle was born in Algiers, son of a French journalist who was a monarchist and a protester against fascism. Bonnier was involved with a royalist group that wanted to make the pretender to the French throne, the Count of Paris, the King of France. He studied at the Lycée Stanislas in Paris after France's surrender to Nazi Germany, and attended a demonstration of anti-German students on Armistice Day 11 November 1940 at the Arc de Triomphe. He then joined the free zone by illegally crossing the border. He returned to Algiers (where his father was a journalist for The Algerian Dispatch) and visited the Youth Camps. After obtaining his degree in 1942, he was surprised by the Allied landings on 8 November 1942 during Operation Torch. A monarchist and ardent anti-Vichyiste, he regretted that his comrades who had participated in Operation Torch, enabling the success of the landing, had not asked him to participate.

Following the landing, Bonnier was one of the first to commit to the Corps Francs d'Afrique training under the initial direction of Henri d'Astier de la Vigerie, former leader of the north African resistance. This training was initiated by a resistance group of 8 November. They opposed the "Admiral of the Fleet" François Darlan who was collaborating with the Nazis. They further objected to serving under generals who had attacked the Allied forces at Oran and in Morocco, including Admiral Jean-Pierre Esteva, who had surrendered Tunisia to Axis forces without a fight.

When d'Astier was appointed head of the police as Deputy Secretary of the Interior, the Corps Francs d'Afrique maintained unofficial relations with the force. Bonnier served as the liaison. He often visited the home of Henri d'Astier, where he also met Lieutenant Father Pierre-Marie Cordier.

After Darlan surrendered Algiers to Allied forces, General Dwight D. Eisenhower, who feared armed resistance from Vichy sympathizers among the French, agreed to allow Darlan to govern French North Africa and West Africa under Vichy policies. This caused consternation in the French population and in Washington and London.

Motivation
At that time, members of the Corps Francs repeatedly covered the walls with slogans that mocked Darlan, such as "Admiral to the fleet!" Darlan was not only attacked for his past collaboration with Germany, but also for his present attitude, upholding the exclusion laws inspired by Germany, as well as other repressive Vichy policies, such as the internment in concentration camps of thousands of French resistance fighters, Spanish Republicans and Central European Democrats.

Conspiracy
Bonnier and three of his comrades, Otto Gross, Robert and Philippe Tournier Ragueneau decided to assassinate Darlan. They had participated a few weeks earlier in the operation of 8 November 1942. The four drew straws and Bonnier drew the shortest. Following the draw, Bonnier procured an old "Ruby" 7.65 pistol. The day of 24 December 1942 was chosen. He received absolution in advance from Abbé Cordier after hearing his confession. Failing to find Darlan that morning at the Summer Palace, he lunched that day with d'Astier.

Attack
They returned to the Summer Palace after eating and settled in a hallway. After some time, the Admiral appeared, accompanied by Frigate captain Hourcade. Bonnier shot Darlan twice, once in the face and once in the chest, and then shot Hourcade in the thigh. The occupants of the other offices in the Palais captured him. Under interrogation he claimed he had acted alone and  seemed unworried about the consequences.

Trial and execution
The next morning, 25 December 1942, he was convicted in less than an hour. Bonnier declared that he had acted only for reasons of moral purity. The judge signed a removal order sending Bonnier to the military tribunal of Algiers. The court sat that night and rejected requests for further investigation. My Viala and Sansonetti acted as lawyers for the accused. The rest of the procedure took place in less than a quarter of an hour. The court discounted Bonnier's motivations and age and sentenced him to death.

The lawyers requested clemency. The law required the appeal to be heard by the Head of State, Philippe Pétain. That procedure would have had to await the end of hostilities. Charles Noguès, dean of the Imperial Council, proclaimed himself acting High Commissioner, under an unpublished order issued by Darlan on 2 December 1942. The order was invalid according to the legal order of Vichy. Nogues immediately rejected the clemency petition. Henri Giraud, who was then head of military justice as Commander-in-chief, refused to postpone execution, and ordered his execution the next morning at 7:30.

Alarmed by his conviction, Bonnier asked to speak to a police officer and Commissioner Garidacci responded. Bonnier revealed that Abbé Cordier was aware of his intentions and implicated Henri d'Astier. Garidacci kept this confession to himself, with the apparent intention of later blackmailing d'Astier.

Giraud was elected that day by members of the Vichy Imperial Council, to replace Darlan. When d'Astier and others appealed to Giraud, he told them it was too late.

Bonnier de la Chapelle was executed in Hussein-Dey, the square known as "the shot". His speedy trial and execution fueled theories about who may have been behind the assassination.

Posthumous rehabilitation
Bonnier was rehabilitated by a Chamber judgment revision of the Court of Appeals on Algiers on 21 December 1945, which ruled that the assassination had been "in the interest of liberation of France."

In June 1950 he was repatriate to Sevres

February 1951: official recognition by the Ministère des Anciens Combattants ‘Mort pour la France’

August 1953: posthumous award of Croix de Guerre and Médaille de la Résistance

Sources
Rick Atkinson, An Army at Dawn: The War in North Africa, 1942–1943, New York: Henry Holt, 2002.
Julian Jackson, France: The Dark Years: 1940–1944, New York: Oxford University Press, 2001.
Douglas Porch, The Path to Victory: The Mediterranean Theater in World War II, New York: Farrar, Straus and Giroux, 2004.

References

1922 births
1942 deaths
People from Algiers
French monarchists
French Resistance members
People executed by Vichy France
Executed French people
French assassins
People convicted of murder by France
French people convicted of murder
Executed assassins
People executed by France by firing squad
Deaths by firearm in Algeria
Overturned convictions in France
Pieds-Noirs
1942 murders in France
French people of colonial Algeria